Maurstad is a surname. Notable people with the surname include:

Alfred Maurstad (1896–1967), Norwegian actor, movie director and theatre manager
David Maurstad (born 1953), American politician
Mari Maurstad (born 1957), Norwegian actress
Toralv Maurstad (1926–2022), Norwegian actor
Tordis Maurstad (1901–1997), Norwegian actress